The 2008 Vietnamese National Cup (known as the Bamboo Airways National Cup for sponsorship reasons) season is the 16th edition of the Vietnamese Cup, the football knockout competition of Vietnam organized by the Vietnam Football Federation.

Pre-classified

Five teams did not play in the first round, and were automatically qualified for the round of 16.
Becamex Binh Duong FC
Binh Dinh FC
HP. Ha Noi
Nam Dinh Football Club
Thanh Hoa FC

First round

Round of 16

Quarter–final round

Semi-finals

Final

References

Vietnamese National Cup
Vietnam
Cup